This is a list of all own goals scored during UEFA European Championship matches, which does not include qualifying matches.

As UEFA is the governing body of football, only goals recorded as own goals by UEFA are noted. Only 20 own goals have been scored in the 16 European Championship tournaments to date, 11 of which occurred in Euro 2020.

Summary
The first European Championship own goal was scored by Anton Ondruš of Czechoslovakia while playing against the Netherlands in the semi-finals of the 1976 tournament, equalising Ondruš's earlier goal and pushing the game into extra time.

The next own goal took place twenty years later, with Lyuboslav Penev of Bulgaria scoring in the 1996 edition while playing against France.

At the following tournament, Dejan Govedarica of FR Yugoslavia scored an own goal while playing against the Netherlands in the quarter-finals of UEFA Euro 2000.

Four years later at UEFA Euro 2004, Igor Tudor of Croatia scored the fastest own goal in a match, taking place in the 22nd minute of his side's group stage match against France. Jorge Andrade of Portugal also scored an own goal at the tournament in the semi-finals against the Netherlands, making it the first European Championship to feature multiple own goals.

The next own goal was scored eight years later by Glen Johnson of England at UEFA Euro 2012, against Sweden in the group stage.

At UEFA Euro 2016, for the first time three own goals were scored in a single tournament. Ciaran Clark of the Republic of Ireland scored the first (playing against Sweden in the group stage), before Birkir Már Sævarsson of Iceland scored an own goal five days later while playing against Hungary. To date, Sævarsson's own goal is the latest in European Championship history, occurring in the 88th minute. One week later, Gareth McAuley of Northern Ireland scored the third own goal of the tournament, while playing in the round of 16 against Wales.

The first own goal of UEFA Euro 2020 came in the tournament's opening game, as Merih Demiral of Turkey put through his own net to open the scoring in a 3–0 loss to Italy; it was the first time the opening goal of a European Championship was awarded as an own goal. The first ever own goal scored by a goalkeeper occurred just three days later, where Wojciech Szczęsny of Poland unluckily had the ball bounce off the post, off his back, and into the net while playing against Slovakia. The following day, Mats Hummels of Germany scored an own goal in his side's loss to France, which saw the 2020 tournament equal the previous edition's record total of three own goals in only the first round of matches. In Germany's following match against Portugal, Portuguese defenders Rúben Dias and Raphaël Guerreiro each scored an own goal in the span of less than five minutes; this was the first ever individual match with two own goals in tournament history, and also took Euro 2020's own goal tally to five, breaking its tie with the 2016 edition for most own goals in a single tournament. Two days later, on 21 June, Finland goalkeeper Lukáš Hrádecký scored an own goal in their last group stage match against Belgium, bringing the record to six goals. On 23 June, goalkeeper Martin Dúbravka and defender Juraj Kucka of Slovakia each scored an own goal in their final group stage match against Spain, becoming the second match with multiple own goals. On 28 June, midfielder Pedri of Spain scored an own goal after a missed back-pass to the goalkeeper during his side's Round of 16 match against Croatia, bringing the number of own goals in the tournament to nine, as many as in the previous 15 competitions combined. This was then exceeded on 2 July when Swiss midfielder Denis Zakaria scored an own goal during his team's quarter-final match against Spain. Five days later, another own goal occurred during the semi-final match-up between Denmark and England where Simon Kjær scored an own goal in the 39th minute bringing the total number of own goals in Euro 2020 to 11.

Own goals

Statistics
 First ever own goal: Anton Ondruš, Czechoslovakia vs Netherlands, 1976
 First ever own goal by a goalkeeper: Wojciech Szczęsny, 18th minute, Poland vs Slovakia, 2021
 Fastest own goal in a match: Denis Zakaria, 8th minute, Switzerland vs Spain, 2021
 Latest own goal in a match: Birkir Már Sævarsson, 88th minute, Iceland vs Hungary, 2016
 Longest own goal in a match: Pedri, 44 metres (this is also the longest own goal scored at any major tournament), 20th minute, Spain vs Croatia, 2021
 Most own goals in a match: 2, Portugal vs Germany, 19 June 2021, Slovakia vs Spain, 21 June 2021
 Most own goals at a tournament: 11, UEFA Euro 2020
 Most overall own goals scored for: 3, Netherlands, France, Spain
 Most overall own goals scored by: 3, Portugal

See also
 List of FIFA World Cup own goals
 List of FIFA Women's World Cup own goals

Notes

References

Own goals
Euro own goals